Aunt Sally is a traditional English game

Aunt Sally may also refer to

Aunt Sally (film), 1933 film
Aunt Sally (band), Japanese band
Aunt Sally, a character from Worzel Gummidge
Aunt Sal, EastEnders character
Straw man, logical fallacy
 Please Excuse My Dear Aunt Sally, a mnemonic for memorizing the order of operations in arithmetic

See also
 Sally (disambiguation)